KZHP-LP is a rock and blues formatted broadcast radio station licensed to and serving Sacramento, California.  KZHP-LP is owned and operated by Process Theatre, Inc. The station in an affiliate of the syndicated Pink Floyd program "Floydian Slip."

References

External links
 Sacramento's K-ZAP Online
 

2015 establishments in California
Blues radio stations
Rock radio stations in the United States
Radio stations established in 2015
ZHP-LP
ZHP-LP